Xena: Warrior Princess is an American  television series that was created by Robert Tapert and John Schulian. Xena is a historical fantasy set primarily in ancient Greece, although it has a flexible time setting and occasionally features Oriental, Egyptian and Medieval elements. The flexible fantasy framework of the show accommodates a considerable range of theatrical styles, from high melodrama to slapstick comedy, from whimsical and musical to all-out action and adventure. While the show is typically set in ancient times, its themes are essentially modern and it investigates the ideas of taking responsibility for past misdeeds, the value of human life, personal liberty and sacrifice, and friendship. The show often addresses ethical dilemmas, such as the morality of pacifism; however, the storylines rarely seek to provide unequivocal solutions.

The character of Xena debuted on March 13, 1995, on the TV series Hercules: The Legendary Journeys. Three episodes featuring Xena, collectively called The Xena Trilogy, initially aired as part of the first season of Hercules: The Legendary Journeys. Xena's own series began on September 4, 1995. The series ran for six seasons and 134 episodes until its final episode aired on May 21, 2001. The series won an Emmy Award in 2001, and was ranked in #10 in TV Guide's Top 25 Cult TV Shows of All Time.

Series overview

Episodes

Introductory episodes (1995)
The program and its namesake character are introduced during the first season of Hercules: The Legendary Journeys. The Hercules: The Legendary Journeys episodes, "The Warrior Princess", "The Gauntlet" and "Unchained Heart", served as pilot episodes for the show.

Season 1 (1995–96)

Season 2 (1996–97)

Season 3 (1997–98)

Season 4 (1998–99)

Season 5 (1999–2000)

Season 6 (2000–01)

Home media release

References

External links
 

 
Xena